Løve (Danish, 'Lion') is a surname derived from "Lion".

See also

Löve (disambiguation)
Love (disambiguation)
Norske Løve (disambiguation)
Den Røde Løve (Danish ship)
Mia Hansen-Løve (born 1981), French film director and screenwriter